True is the fourth album by L'Arc-en-Ciel, released on December 12, 1996. It was the band's last record with sakura on drums. It reached number one on the Oricon chart and sold over a million copies, being certified by the RIAJ. It was also named one of the top albums from 1989 to 1998 in a 2004 issue of the music magazine Band Yarouze.

Track listing

Personnel
 hyde – vocals, backing vocals, harmonica on track 4, handclaps on track 9
 ken – guitar, backing vocals, vibraphone on track 2, tambourine on track 5, handclaps on track 9
 tetsu – bass guitar, backing vocals, handclaps on track 9
 sakura – drums, backing vocals, handclaps on track 9
 Asuka Kaneko – violin on tracks 1 and 10, strings on track 7
 Shinobu Hashimoto – cello on tracks 1 and 10
 Take – tambourine on tracks 3 and 6
 Shinri Sasaki – female chorus on track 4
 Kimiyoshi Nagoya (Tokyo Ska Paradise Orchestra) – trumpet on track 6
 Masahiko Kitahara (Tokyo Ska Paradise Orchestra) – trombone on track 6
 Tatsuyuki Hiyamuta (Tokyo Ska Paradise Orchestra) – alto saxophone on track 6
 Gamou (Tokyo Ska Paradise Orchestra) – tenor saxophone on track 6
 Atsushi Yanaka (Tokyo Ska Paradise Orchestra) – baritone saxophone on track 6
 Yasushi Nakanishi – piano, organ on track 9
 Jake H. Concepcion – alto sax, clarinet on track 9
 Susumu Kazuhara – trumpet on track 9
 Kiyoshi Okatarou – trombone on track 9
 Hirofumi Kinjou – tenor sax on track 9
 Yusaku, Reiko, Nozomi, Yukari, Toshiyuki – children chorus on track 9
 Takako Ogawa – female chorus on track 10

References

1996 albums
L'Arc-en-Ciel albums